Amata borneogena is a species of moth of the subfamily Arctiinae first described by Obraztsov in 1955. It is found on Borneo and the Natuna Islands.

References 

borneogena
Moths of Asia